Julus curvicornis is a species of millipede from the Julidae family. It was described by Karl Wilhelm Verhoeff in 1899 and is endemic to Slovakia.

References

External links
Image of Julus curvicornis

Julida
Millipedes of Europe
Endemic fauna of Slovakia
Animals described in 1899
Taxa named by Karl Wilhelm Verhoeff